Eternalism may refer to:

 Eternalism (philosophy of time), the philosophical theory which takes the view that all points in time are equally "real", as opposed to the Presentism (philosophy of time) idea that only the present is real
 Positive belief in the eternity of the world or the law of conservation of energy
Eternalism is the common translation of sassatavada, the doctrine of unchanging being rejected by Buddhism
 Eternalism, third album of alternative rock band The Panic Division

See also
Eternity